The third season of the American television series Atlanta premiered on March 24, 2022, on FX. The season is produced by RBA, 343 Incorporated, MGMT. Entertainment, and FXP, with Donald Glover, Paul Simms, Dianne McGunigle, Stephen Glover, Hiro Murai, and Stefani Robinson serving as executive producers. Donald Glover serves as creator and showrunner, writing two episodes and directing three episodes of the season.

The season was ordered in June 2018. It stars Donald Glover, Brian Tyree Henry, LaKeith Stanfield, and Zazie Beetz. The series follows Earn during his daily life in Atlanta, Georgia, as he tries to redeem himself in the eyes of his ex-girlfriend Van, who is also the mother of his daughter Lottie; as well as his parents and his cousin Alfred, who raps under the stage name "Paper Boi"; and Darius, Alfred's eccentric right-hand man. The season takes place in Europe, with the characters in the middle of a European tour. The European cities featured throughout the season include Amsterdam, London, and Paris. The season also explores events happening back in America outside of the core characters in several stand-alone episodes with a vignette format. Fans and critics have speculated that these episodes are depictions of Earn's dreams. These episodes take place in Atlanta, and New York.

The season premiered on March 24, 2022, on FX. The season premiere received 0.310 million viewers with a 0.1 ratings share in the 18–49 demographics. The season ended on May 20, 2022, with an average of 0.25 million viewers, which was a 61% decrease from the previous season. The season has received critical acclaim, with television commentators lauding the performances, directing, writing, and storytelling. However, the standalone episodes have garnered a more mixed response as the season has gone on; whilst they were initially praised, as they have progressed criticisms have gone towards the abrupt changes in settings, the anthological nature of each episode, as well as the main cast not appearing in any of the standalone episodes. In August 2019, two and a half years before the season started airing, FX renewed the series for a fourth and final season.

Cast and characters

Main
 Donald Glover as Earnest "Earn" Marks
 Brian Tyree Henry as Alfred "Paper Boi" Miles
 LaKeith Stanfield as Darius
 Zazie Beetz as Vanessa "Van" Keefer

Guest
 Tobias Segal as Earnest Marks / E / White Earn
 Laura Dreyfuss as Amber
 Justin Bartha as Marshall Johnson
 Chet Hanks as Curtis
 Liam Neeson as himself
 George Wallace as Greg
 Kevin Samuels as Robert S. Lee
 Alexander Skarsgård as himself
 Adriyan Rae as Candice
 Xosha Roquemore as Xosha

Episodes

Production

Development
The series was renewed for a third season in June 2018. FX Networks and FX Productions programming president Nick Grad commented, “Atlanta is phenomenal, achieving and exceeding what few television series have done. With Atlanta Robbin' Season, Donald and his collaborators elevated the series to even greater heights, building on the enormous success of their award-winning first season. We're grateful to the producers and our extraordinary cast and crew for achieving this level of excellence, and we share the excitement with our audience about the third season knowing they will continue to take us to unexpected and thrilling places."

In August 2019, FX confirmed that the season would consist of eight episodes. In January 2020, FX upped the episode order to ten episodes.

Writing
Before production started, Stephen Glover said that the season would focus on more female-centric stories, "I think we have some cool ideas in season three that'll put some more women on screen. There's a very specific perspective from the Atlanta woman that I think we're gonna explore in season three."

Regarding about setting the season in Europe, Donald Glover said "It's our point of view; it's not really about the place. Although in Season 4, it makes a very heavy resurgence, as far as the actual place. Atlanta is a state of mind. Europe solidified how we felt while writing Season 3. Director Hiro Murai calls it our maximum season."

In 2020, Donald Glover drew attention when he claimed that the third and fourth season "are going to be some of the best television ever made. Sopranos only ones who can touch us." When questioned about the statement, Glover said "I'm not backing down from that shit. I'm holding my nuts out on that shit. I just want audiences to know this shit is good. It's high quality shit."

Part of the season is divided on anthology episodes, consisting of "Three Slaps", "The Big Payback", "Trini 2 De Bone", and "Rich Wigga, Poor Wigga". Executive producer Stefani Robinson explained the decision, "it just sort of felt like the natural progression of what we wanted to try creatively. Donald has done such a good job of making us feel like the show can really be whatever we want it to be in terms of creativity. He's referred to it a couple of times as a playground or at least this is how it feels. You don't have to be shackled to this idea of making a more traditional sitcom or comedy structure. This is something very different."

Filming
In January 2019, Zazie Beetz stated that filming for the season would be delayed due to the cast's schedule. In August 2019, FX confirmed that the season would start filming on spring 2020, filming back-to-back with the fourth season. However, production was shut down amidst the COVID-19 pandemic. Production was set to resume in April 2021, with the series planning to film in Europe. Donald Glover confirmed that production on the season started on April 2, 2021. In August 2021, FX confirmed that the season wrapped filming.

Release

Broadcast
In February 2019, Chairman of FX, John Landgraf, confirmed that the season would be delayed and that it would miss eligibility for the 71st Primetime Emmy Awards. In January 2020, Landgraf said that the season would air in January 2021, with the fourth season airing later that year. However, due to production pausing due to the COVID-19 pandemic, Landgraf said the season would not be ready for its intended January 2021 premiere date, later signaling that the season would premiere in 2022. In December 2021, FX finally announced that the season would premiere on March 24, 2022.

Marketing
In October 2021, a teaser trailer for the season was released. A new trailer debuted in December 2021. The first two episodes premiered at the 2022 South by Southwest on March 19, 2022.

Reception

Critical reception

Based upon the first two episodes given to critics, the third season has received critical acclaim. The season has a score of 91 out of 100 on Metacritic, based on 21 critics, indicating "universal acclaim". On Rotten Tomatoes, it has an approval rating of 97%, based on 121 reviews, with an average rating of 8.8/10. The site's critical consensus reads, "Atlanta takes Paper Boi and his entourage out of Georgia, but this inspired third season proves that the more things change, the more they stay weird."

Daniel Fienberg of The Hollywood Reporter gave it a highly positive review and wrote, "no other show on TV is doing the thing that Atlanta does, with its doses of humor, surrealism, horror, travelogue and hip-hop as genre-blending starting points for an uncomfortable exploration of racial identity in America." Liz Shannon Miller of Consequence wrote that the series "remains as ethereal and shocking and fascinating as ever" and "in just the first two episodes of Season 3, the creative team delivers at least a half-dozen moments you'll never forget. Atlanta is a gift."

Accolades

Notes

References

External links 
 
 

Atlanta (TV series)
2022 American television seasons